The Daily Citizen is a daily newspaper published in Dalton, Georgia. It is the flagship newspaper of North Georgia Newspaper Group, a division of Community Newspaper Holdings Inc.

The newspaper was founded in 1847 as The North Georgia Citizen.

Besides The Daily Citizen, the newspaper group publishes the monthly Dalton Magazine, Calhoun Magazine, Catoosa Life Magazine, Health, Mind & Body magazine and a Spanish-language weekly newspaper, El Informador, all of which are distributed in and around Dalton, and other publications in Georgia and Tennessee.

References

External links 
 Daily Citizen Website
 CNHI Website

Dalton, Georgia
Newspapers published in Georgia (U.S. state)
Newspapers established in 1847
1847 establishments in Georgia (U.S. state)